To: Elliott, From: Portland is a 2006 tribute album to Elliott Smith that contains musicians from Portland, Oregon. The Thermals' version of "Ballad of Big Nothing" was recorded and mixed by Smith's ex-girlfriend Joanna Bolme. Many of the artists knew Smith personally and played with Smith at various times.

Track listing

External links 

 Pitchfork review
 AllMusic review

Elliott Smith tribute albums
2006 compilation albums